The Nova Scotia Fencibles were a military regiment raised in Nova Scotia, Canada, in 1803.  The unit had red uniforms with yellow facings.

History 
The Nova Scotia Fencibles were the only regiment stationed in Newfoundland in 1812.

Although posted to Kingston in Upper Canada in 1814, the regiment did not see action and was disbanded in 1816.

Half the unit, some 210 officers and other ranks, together with 48 wives and children, were on board the  when it wrecked on 10 June 1816 near Green Island, having cleared the Saint Lawrence River. The Regiment had marched from Kingston to Quebec and had embarked there for Nova Scotia. Four soldiers, two wives, and two children lost their lives; all others were saved. Contemporary accounts referred to the regiment as the Royal Nova Scotia Regiment, which had, however, been disbanded some years earlier.

Notable members 
 William Ross, d. 1822, Nova Scotia Fencibles; founder of Ross Farm, Lunenburg County, Nova Scotia
 Colin Alexander McNabb, Lieut. in H.M. late Nova Scotia Fencibles Regt., who departed this life Nov. 10th, 1820.
 Otto Schwartz, Nova Scotia Fencibles
Colonel Edward Baynes
 Lieutenant Colonel Baylies of the Nova Scotia Fencibles

See also 
Canadian units of the War of 1812
Military history of Nova Scotia
Royal Fencible American Regiment

References 

 Harry Piers, "The Fortieth Regiment, Raised at Annapolis Royal in 1717; And Five Regiments Subsequently Raised in Nova Scotia," Nova Scotia Historical Society (1927), Vol. 21
 Lieut. General Francis Aug. Wetherall, Colonel of His Majesty's Nova Scotia Regiment of Fencibles ... certify that the bearer hereof ... is hereby discharged ... (1816)

Links 
Regular British and Canadian Regiments in the Canadas

Infantry regiments of Canada
Military regiments raised in Nova Scotia
Canadian military units and formations of the War of 1812
Military units and formations disestablished in the 1810s